23rd FFCC Awards
December 21, 2018

Best Picture:
The Favourite

The 23rd Florida Film Critics Circle Awards were held on December 21, 2018.

The nominations were announced on December 19, 2018, led by The Favourite with nine nominations.

Winners and nominees

Winners are listed at the top of each list in bold, while the runner-ups for each category are listed under them.

References

External links
 

2018 film awards
2010s